Petrakov is a Slavic masculine surname, its feminine counterpart is Petrakova. It may refer to:
Anna Petrakova (born 1984), Russian basketball player
Marina Petrakova (born 1991), Kazakhstani rhythmic gymnast
Oleksandr Petrakov (born 1957), Ukrainian football defender
Valery Petrakov (born 1958), Russian footballer striker
Vitaly Petrakov (born 1954), Russian cyclist
Yuri Petrakov (born 1991), Russian footballer midfielder

See also
The Russian name for the city of Piotrków Trybunalski, Poland

Russian-language surnames